The Actual is a 1997 novella by the American author Saul Bellow.

Plot synopsis
Like most of Bellow's fiction, the story centers on the lives of a group of passionate and anxious people living in Chicago. Harry Trellman has formed a friendship with the fabulously wealthy Sigmund Adletsky. Sigmund aims to bring Harry together with Harry's childhood sweetheart, Amy Wustrin.

Reception
Publishers Weekly called it "(a) kind of an affectionate, latter-day 'Lovesong of J. Alfred Prufrock", in which "plot (is) secondary". Kirkus Reviews considered it to be "witty" and "sharp", with "vividly sketched characters" but "perfunctory" plotting. In the Guardian, Martin Amis called it "scrupulously written".

References

1997 American novels
Novels by Saul Bellow
American novellas
Novels set in Chicago
Viking Press books